There have been two "National Parties" in the history of Chile:

The National Party of 1857-1933, created by the supporters of President Manuel Montt and Interior Minister Antonio Varas, also known as Montt-varista Party.
The National Party of 1966-1973, created by the union of the right-wing Liberal and Conservative parties.

Defunct political parties in Chile